Anderson University may refer to:

Anderson University (Indiana), in Anderson, Indiana, U.S.
Anderson University (South Carolina), in Anderson, South Carolina, U.S.
Anderson's University, a former name of the University of Strathclyde, Glascow, Scotland
Anderson College of Health, Business and Technology, formerly National Academy of Health & Business, in Toronto, Ontario, Canada